Li Di (1100 – after 1197) was a Chinese imperial court painter in the Song Dynasty.

Di was born in Heyang (河陽 – present day Meng County in Henan Province). He was noted for painting flowers, birds, bamboo, and animals in motion. Di was a member of the Academy of Worthies.

Notes

References
Barnhart, R. M. et al. (1997). Three Thousand Years of Chinese Painting. New Haven, Yale University Press. .
Ci hai bian ji wei yuan hui. Ci hai . Shanghai: Shanghai ci shu chu ban she , 1979.

Song dynasty painters
1100s births
Year of death unknown
Court painters
Artists from Luoyang
Painters from Henan
12th-century Chinese painters
12th-century Chinese people